Fez I: Valley of Trees is an adventure for fantasy role-playing games published by Mayfair Games in 1982.

Contents
Fez I: Valley of Trees is a three-round tournament scenario.  The player characters must retrieve several of Fez the Wizard's magic items and wake him from a magical sleep, then help him to slay the dragon Scarsnout.

Fez I: Valley of Trees is a tournament-style adventure for team use that provides stats for player characters with modifications provided for a DM to work it into an existing campaign. The main objective of the adventure is the slaying of an evil dragon, which the players must do by fulfilling several prophesies. The characters begin the adventure by being raised from the dead, and they all find that they have partial amnesia so they find what would normally be a simple task turning into a very challenging one. The central character of this adventure is Fez, a time-travelling wizard who studies prophesies and does his best to make them come true.

Publication history
Fez I: Valley of Trees was written by Len Bland and James Robert, and was published by Mayfair Games in 1982 as a 40-page book with an outer folder and a cover sheet.

Mayfair Games kicked off its Role Aids game line with Beastmaker Mountain (1982), Nanorien Stones (1982) and Fez I (1982).

Fez I: Wizard's Vale is its revised version, published in 1987.

Reception
Kelly Grimes and Aaron Allston reviewed Fez I in The Space Gamer #58.  They noted that the adventure "seems more adaptable to other game systems than some such adventures". They commented: "The adventure is different from most modules on the market because the players are not told anything about their characters beyond their names and some scraps of their memories. The DM, of course, has the complete information on the characters, the quest, the prophesies, and so on. Detail on the adventurer's background is good, but not cumbersome. Intelligent players will also be able to figure out a good deal about their characters from the initial hints, and will be able to put more pieces together to better flesh out the characters by the adventure's end." Grimes and Allston concluded the review by discussing some of the adventure's flaws: "At the adventure's end, Fez is supposed to claim four of the magic items the party has found; unfortunately, the text doesn't say which ones or whether it makes a difference in the next adventure. One castle which the characters visit was once inhabited by a wizardly practical joker; once again we get a splash of silliness. It's really too difficult an adventure for novice DMs or players. However, it's a good package, and experienced players should enjoy it."

Lawrence Schick, in his book Heroic Worlds says: "The Fez series is sort of humorous and includes lots of problem-solving.  Also suitable with for use with D&D and T&T, supposedly."

References

Fantasy role-playing game adventures
Role Aids
Role-playing game supplements introduced in 1982